Margaret Wilson is an Australian television writer, who has also worked as a script editor and script producer. She currently works as a writer for Home and Away and Neighbours. Wilson won an AWGIE Award for Best Script for a Television Serial in 2008. She was also nominated in the same category the 2014 AWGIE Awards for her work on "Episode 6820" of Neighbours.

Select credits
Water Rats
Home and Away 1995–present
Neighbours 1998–2002, 2013–2022
Out of the Blue
All Saints
Packed to the Rafters 2008–2013
McLeod's Daughters
Always Greener

References

External links

Margaret Wilson at National Film and Sound Archive

Australian women writers
Living people
Year of birth missing (living people)
Australian screenwriters